Jan Willem de Pous (23 January 1920 – 6 January 1996) was a Dutch politician of the defunct Christian Historical Union (CHU) party now merged into the Christian Democratic Appeal (CDA) party and economist.

De Pous attended the Amsterdams Lyceum from June 1935 until June 1938 and applied at the University of Amsterdam in June 1939 majoring in Economics and obtaining a Bachelor of Economics degree before leaving the University during the German occupation in April 1942 and joined the Dutch resistance against the German occupiers and worked as a journalist for the underground newspaper Trouw from April 1942 until January 1946. Following the end of World War II De Pous returned to the University of Amsterdam in July 1945 and also worked as a researcher before graduating  with a Master of Economics degree in July 1947. De Pous applied at the Northwestern University in Evanston, Illinois in July 1947 for a postgraduate education and obtained a Master of Financial Economics degree in November 1949. De Pous worked as a trade association executive for the Christian Employers' association (NCW) served as General-Secretary from 1 November 1949 until 1 January 1953 and as an associate professor of Public economics at the University of Amsterdam from 1 January 1953 until 1 December 1958. On 8 October 1958 De Pous was nominated as Member of the Council of State, taking office on 1 December 1958. After the election of 1959 De Pous was appointed as Minister of Economic Affairs in the Cabinet De Quay, taking office on 19 May 1959. In February 1963 De Pous announced that he would not stand for the election of 1963. Following the cabinet formation of 1963 De Pous was not giving a cabinet post in the new cabinet, the Cabinet De Quay was replaced by the Cabinet Marijnen on 24 July 1963.

De Pous remained in active politics, in April 1964 De Pous was nominated as Chairman of the Social and Economic Council (SER), serving from 1 May 1964 until 1 February 1985. De Pous also became active in the private sector and public sector and occupied numerous seats as a corporate director and nonprofit director on several boards of directors and supervisory boards (Overloon War Museum, Institute for Multiparty Democracy, ProDemos and the International Institute of Social History) and served on several state commissions and councils on behalf of the government (Cals-Donner Commission, Mine Council, Council for Culture and Stichting Pensioenfonds ABP).

Decorations

Honours

Honorary degrees

References

External links

Official
  Dr. J.W. (Jan) de Pous Parlement & Politiek

 

 

 

 

1920 births
1996 deaths
Chairmen of the Social and Economic Council
Christian Democratic Appeal politicians
Christian Historical Union politicians
Dutch corporate directors
Dutch expatriates in the United States
Dutch financial writers
Dutch members of the Dutch Reformed Church
Dutch newspaper editors
Dutch nonprofit directors
Dutch people of World War II
Dutch political writers
Dutch trade association executives
Grand Officers of the Order of Orange-Nassau
Knights of the Order of the Netherlands Lion
Members of the Council of State (Netherlands)
Members of the Social and Economic Council
Ministers of Economic Affairs of the Netherlands
Northwestern University alumni
People from Aalsmeer
Politicians from The Hague
University of Amsterdam alumni
Academic staff of Vrije Universiteit Amsterdam
20th-century Dutch businesspeople
20th-century Dutch civil servants
20th-century Dutch economists
20th-century Dutch educators
20th-century Dutch male writers
20th-century Dutch politicians